Corinne Touzet (born 21 December 1959) is a French actress and producer. She is best known for her starring role as Isabelle Florent in the French police drama series Une femme d'honneur which ran from 1996 - 2008.

Personal life
She gave birth to her only daughter in 1994.

Theater

Filmography

References

External links 

 
 Interview with Corinne Touzet on Eurochannel

1959 births
Living people
People from Orthez
French film actresses
French television actresses
20th-century French actresses
21st-century French actresses